The 2009 Montana Grizzlies football team represented the University of Montana in the 2009 NCAA Division I FCS football season. The Grizzlies were led by head coach Bobby Hauck and played their home games at Washington–Grizzly Stadium.

Schedule

References

Montana
Montana Grizzlies football seasons
Big Sky Conference football champion seasons
Montana Grizzlies football